The 2020–21 Denver Pioneers men's ice hockey season was the 72nd season of play for the program and the 8th in the NCHC conference. The Pioneers represented the University of Denver and were coached by David Carle, in his 3rd season.

Season
As a result of the ongoing COVID-19 pandemic the entire college ice hockey season was delayed. Because the NCAA had previously announced that all winter sports athletes would retain whatever eligibility they possessed through at least the following year, none of Denver's players would lose a season of play. However, the NCAA also approved a change in its transfer regulations that would allow players to transfer and play immediately rather than having to sit out a season, as the rules previously required.

Denver came into the season with high expectations. From the start, however, nothing seemed to go right for the Pioneers. After the season's start was delayed, Denver joined the rest of the NCHC in Omaha, Nebraska for a condensed slate of games in December. The team started slow but looked like they were rounding into form in mid-December. Unfortunately, a theme for the entire season proved to be inconsistency. For most of the year the Pioneers couldn't string together a series of wins, or even strong performances, and they watched as their ranking fell every week until they left the top-20 altogether. By the end of the season Denver sat in the middle of the standings but was 3 games below .500.

While there were some who still included the Pioneers as possible bubble teams, their losing record was a sizable impediment to the team playing in the NCAA Tournament. Denver's only probably road to the tournament was to win the NCHC Championship and the team responded well in the quarterfinals, overcoming a 2-goal deficit to upset tournament-bound Omaha. In the semis they faced #2 North Dakota and took a lead into the third period. The Hawks outplayed Denver in the frame but, as time went along, it appeared that Magnus Chrona might be able to shut out UND. It took North Dakota pulling their goaltender to give them enough firepower to break through and tie the game. In the overtime session, Denver never found their footing and were outshot 9–1 in less than nine minutes. The final goal came from a UND stick and ended the game as well as any chance Denver had to extend their season. This was Denver's first losing season in 21 years.

Departures

Recruiting

Roster
As of March 1, 2021.

Standings

Schedule and Results

|-
!colspan=12 style="color:white; background:#862633; " | Regular Season

|-
!colspan=12 style="color:white; background:#862633; " |

Scoring statistics

Goaltending statistics

Rankings

USCHO did not release a poll in week 20.

Awards and honors

Players drafted into the NHL

2021 NHL Entry Draft

† incoming freshman

References

Denver Pioneers men's ice hockey seasons
Denver Pioneers
Denver Pioneers
Denver Pioneers
Denver Pioneers
Denver Pioneers